The Cachar wedge-billed babbler or chevron-breasted babbler (Stachyris roberti) is a species of bird in the Old World babbler family (Timaliidae).  It is named for the Cachar Hills in southern Assam.

It is found from Northeast India, in Assam, Arunachal Pradesh and nearby areas. Its natural habitats are subtropical or tropical moist lowland forests and subtropical or tropical moist montane forests. It is becoming rare due to habitat loss.

References

Collar, N. J. & Robson, C. 2007. Family Timaliidae (Babblers)  pp. 70 – 291 in; del Hoyo, J., Elliott, A. & Christie, D.A. eds. Handbook of the Birds of the World, Vol. 12. Picathartes to Tits and Chickadees. Lynx Edicions, Barcelona.

Cachar wedge-billed babbler
Birds of Northeast India
Cachar wedge-billed babbler